Rudolph H. Sikich (February 12, 1921 – January 4, 1998) was an American football tackle who played one season with the Cleveland Rams of the NFL. He was drafted by the Brooklyn Tigers in the fourth round of the 1944 NFL Draft. Sikich played college football at the University of Minnesota and attended Hibbing High School in Hibbing, Minnesota. In 2000, he was inducted into the Hibbing High School Athletic Hall of Fame.

References

External links
Just Sports Stats

1921 births
1998 deaths
Players of American football from Minnesota
American football tackles
Minnesota Golden Gophers football players
Cleveland Rams players
Sportspeople from Hibbing, Minnesota
Hibbing High School alumni